A victory jig or victory dance is a celebration of a victory or success with a dance, shuffle or body movement. It is most commonly used in sports. The term can be used approvingly or abusively.  A victory jig can be engaged in as a genuine celebration or as a means to humiliate or taunt an opponent.

Examples
 Touchdown celebration, an example of a victory dance in American and Canadian football
 Gatorade shower, another type of victory dance in American football
 Goal celebration, an example of a victory dance in association football (soccer)

Notable occurrences
The 25 February 1964 fight between Cassius Clay and Sonny Liston when Clay did a "Victory jig" to taunt his opponent in the ring.  See main article Ali versus Liston.
Unionist politician David Trimble's victory jig with Ian Paisley in Northern Ireland after the 12 July 1995 Drumcree March (Drumcree I).

See also
 Victory pose

References

Syllabus-free dance
Sports culture